Alexander Muss High School in Hod HaSharon, Israel is a pluralistic study-abroad program in Hod HaSharon, Israel, for high school students. Programs run throughout the year and range in length from 6 weeks to 18 weeks. The school is a fully accredited institution and students can continue in their high school subjects while abroad. Students are also eligible to earn college credit through the University of Miami. Its flagship campus in Israel. The school has an average enrollment of 1200 students. It has four dormitories and a mini-dorm, and is a college prep program for international high school students. Having merged with Jewish National Fund (JNF) USA in 2013, AMHSI-JNF has begun its global expansion for all High School students.

History
Alexander Muss High School in Israel was founded in 1972 by Rabbi Morris Kipper in concert with the Greater Miami Jewish Federation. The concept of teaching history onsite where history took place presented engaging educational opportunities to connect students to the history and culture of Israel. The school soon grew beyond its Florida roots to be a nationwide program, and welcomes students from across North America, Australia, and Europe.  It also partners with day schools and community groups to customize programs according to each group's needs.

Curriculum
The school's curriculum is conducted in chronological historical order and is designed to introduce students to facts, concepts and events basic to understanding the development of Western Civilization. Through a combination of visits to historical sites and in-depth analysis of written history, students learn to go beyond the acquisition of facts. Students are instilled with the leadership and motivational skills that enable them to excel in higher education and beyond.

Day school and community programs
The school has customized academic Israel programs for student groups from Adelson Educational Campus in Las Vegas, NV, American Hebrew Academy in Greensboro, NC, Charles E. Smith Jewish Day School in Rockville, MD, David Posnack Jewish Day School in Davie, FL, The Emery/Weiner School in Houston, TX, Gann Academy in Waltham, MA, Jack M. Barrack Hebrew Academy in Bryn Mawr, PA, Milken Community High School in Los Angeles, CA, Weber School in Atlanta, GA, Bialik College in Melbourne, Australia.

Notable alumni
Arick Wierson – Columnist for CNN, Emmy Award-winning television producer, former advisor to New York City Mayor Michael Bloomberg
Benj Gershman – Bass guitarist of O.A.R.
Brett Ratner – Film producer and director
Chris Culos – Drummer of O.A.R.
Debra Zane – Casting director
Lauren Weisberger – author of The Devil Wears Prada
Lisa Miller – Author of The Spiritual Child and Columbia University Professor
Marc Roberge – Lead singer of O.A.R.
Matisyahu
Michael Levin
Sheryl Sandberg – Chief Operating Officer of Facebook
Wayne Firestone
Reece Calvin – soccer, Forest Green Rovers

References

Boarding schools in Israel
High schools in Israel
Educational institutions established in 1972
1972 establishments in Israel